The 2007 Final Resolution was a professional wrestling pay-per-view (PPV) event produced by Total Nonstop Action Wrestling (TNA), which took place on January 14, 2007 at the TNA Impact! Zone in Orlando, Florida. It was the third event under the Final Resolution chronology. Seven matches were featured on the event's card.

The pay-per-view had a buy rate of 35,000. In October 2017, with the launch of the Global Wrestling Network, the event became available to stream on demand.

Storylines
The event featured wrestlers from pre-existing scripted feuds and storylines. Wrestlers portrayed villains, heroes, or less distinguishable characters in the scripted events that built tension and culminated in a wrestling match or series of matches.

Event

Prior to the start of the event there was a dark match which saw Jason Riggs and Johnny Riggs defeat Serotonin (Kazarian and Havok) when Riggs pinned Havok.

Following this match there was one match during the pre-show. During this match Lance Hoyt defeated Chase Stevens. Hoyt pinned Stevens after a Fireman's carry flapjack. A. J. Pierzynski and Dale Torborg were in the audience and heckled Hoyt resulting in a confrontation after the match.

During the first match of the pay-per-view, Rhino defeated A.J. Styles in a Last Man Standing match (14:44) when Styles failed to answer the ten-count after Rhino hit two Gore's. Next Chris Sabin defeated Christopher Daniels and Jerry Lynn in a 3-Way Dance to win the TNA X Division Championship, when Sabin pinned Lynn with a roll-up while grabbing the tights.

In the Paparazzi Championship Series finals, Alex Shelley defeated Austin Starr. The judges were "Samolian Joe", "Big Fat Oily Guy" and Bob Backlund. The match originally went to a ten-minute time limit draw and was then declared a draw by the judges, before Kevin Nash ordered extra time. Shelley pinned Starr with a roll-up, and Shelley was presented a bowling trophy.

Next James Storm defeated Petey Williams, when Storm pinned Williams while grabbing the ropes during a roll-up. Jacqueline made her return to TNA and delivered a Death Sentence with Storm to Gail Kim.

In the NWA World Tag Team Championship match, The Latin American Exchange (Homicide and Hernandez) defeated Team 3D (Brother Ray and Brother Devon) by disqualification to retain the titles. Team 3D were disqualified after a drunk Brother Runt interfered, jumping off the top rope onto Homicide.

The penultimate match was a 30 minutes Iron Man match between Kurt Angle and Samoa Joe. The winner of the match a shot at the NWA World Heavyweight Championship at Against All Odds. Joe forced Angle to submit to the Coquina Clutch to pick up the first fall. Angle then forced Joe to submit to the Ankle Lock to even the score at 1:1. Angle again forced Joe to submit to the Ankle Lock to take a 2:1 lead. Joe next pinned Angle after a Muscle Buster to even the score at 2:2. Angle picked up the final decision with approximately 5 minutes left in the match, when he pinned Joe with a cradle pin.

In the main event Abyss defended the NWA World Heavyweight Championship against Christian Cage and Sting in a Three Way Elimination match. Sting first pinned Abyss after the Scorpion Death Drop guaranteeing a new champion would be crowned. Cage next pinned Sting after a Frog Splash to win the championship.

Results

References

Final Resolution
2007 in professional wrestling in Florida
Professional wrestling shows in Orlando, Florida
January 2007 events in the United States
2007 Total Nonstop Action Wrestling pay-per-view events